The Kyung-Ahm Prize is a series of awards presented annually from the Kyung-Ahm Education & Cultural Foundation. Founded in 2005 with a 100 billion KRW endowment by Geum-Jo Song, the award originally had four categories and in addition to the  award, laureates are given 100 million KRW to 200 million KRW in prize money; the highest nationally. The foundation also hosts academic lectures by laureates.

Recipients
The award has been given to the following individuals among four to six categories. For certain years, there is not a winner under some categories.

References

External links
 Kyung-Ahm Education & Cultural Foundation

South Korean awards
Awards established in 2005
2005 establishments in South Korea